Morten Harket (born September 14, 1959) is a Norwegian vocalist and songwriter, who is the lead singer of the synthpop/rock band A-ha.

A-ha has released 11 studio albums to date, and topped the charts internationally after their breakthrough hit "Take On Me" in 1985. Harket has also released six solo albums. Before joining a-ha in 1982, Harket had appeared on the Oslo club scene as the singer for blues outfit Souldier Blue.

Harket was named a Knight First Class of the Order of St. Olav by King Harald for his services to Norwegian music and his international success.

Early life 
The son of Reidar, a chief physician at a hospital, and Henny, an economics teacher and brother to Gunvald, Håkon, Ingunn and Kjetil, Morten grew up in Asker in southern Norway. His early musical influences included Uriah Heep, Jimi Hendrix, Queen, Johnny Cash, Simon and Garfunkel, David Bowie, and James Brown. Morten's father had contemplated becoming a classical pianist; Morten also took piano lessons for a while but lacked the discipline to practice. At the age of four he started writing music and playing piano.

Music career

A-ha
The trio, comprising lead vocalist Harket, guitarist Paul Waaktaar-Savoy (Pål Waaktaar until his marriage in 1994), and keyboardist Magne Furuholmen, formed on 14 September 1982, and left Norway for London to make a career in the music business. They chose the studio of musician, producer, and soon-to-be-manager John Ratcliff, because it had a Space Invaders machine. Ratcliff introduced the band to his manager, Terry Slater, and, after a few meetings, a-ha had two managers. Slater and Ratcliff together formed T.J. Management. Ratcliff dealt with all the technical and musical aspects; Slater was the international business manager and liaison to Warner Brothers' head office. The band says the name a-ha comes from a title Paul contemplated giving to a song; he was dithering between the titles "a-ha" and "a-hem". Morten was looking through Paul's notebook, and came across the name, which he liked, and immediately decided that it was the right name.

In 1984, A-ha released their first single, "Take On Me", which became a hit only on the third attempt in 1985, after it had been re-recorded and accompanied by a music video directed by Steve Barron. The single's international success helped a-ha's debut album Hunting High and Low to sell over 10 million copies worldwide. Their second studio album was Scoundrel Days, followed by Stay on These Roads and East of the Sun, West of the Moon. The band then issued the commercially disappointing Memorial Beach, after which the band went on hiatus. Harket re-joined his colleagues in a-ha in 1998 to perform at the Nobel Peace Prize concert. Since 1998, a-ha has released four studio albums and several compilations. Their eighth studio album Analogue was released in 2005, and became a big hit worldwide, achieving Platinum certification in the UK. The band's last studio album before their split, Foot of the Mountain, was released in the spring of 2009.

Harket held a note for 20.2 seconds in A-ha's 2000 song "Summer Moved On", believed to be the longest note in UK chart history. The note held exceeds the chest voice note in Bill Withers' famous song "Lovely Day" by 2.2 seconds. In October 2009, A-ha announced that they would disband after a farewell tour in 2010. Tickets for A-ha's final concert at the Oslo Spektrum on 4 December 2010 sold out within 2 hours. On 27 September 2015, a-ha reunited for a huge crowd assembled at Rock in Rio 2015 festival in Rio de Janeiro, Brazil, which led to a reunion tour and the Cast in Steel album.

In June 2017 the band performed for MTV Unplugged in their homeland. The performance was released as a live album that September, and the acoustic version of "Take On Me" was made part of the soundtrack of the Hollywood movie Deadpool 2.

As a band member

Paul Waaktaar-Savoy describes Harket as being "totally different from me." He recalls the band's first visit to London together, during which Harket burned all his clothes and re-fashioned his wardrobe. "He has given me self-confidence, encourages me to talk to people, not to be afraid and to use the abilities I have. Morten is actually the only one in Norway who had as much ambition as I did. I guess we both have big egos. In a way, we're each sitting in our own little world, while Mags is more down to earth. Mags often has to mediate between Morten and me... It's good that we're so different and still respect each other. The tension between us is creative."

Magne Furuholmen describes Harket as "together". Furuholmen says Harket "believes strongly in everything he does. This goes for the band too, and it rubs off on us. He has the courage of his own convictions and cannot be shaken. He's an expert at always getting the last word, whether he's right or not. Morten is very loyal and he's fair when it comes to giving people a chance, letting them show who they are and what they're worth before judging them."

On a-ha recordings, Morten has sung with Graham Nash, Lissie, Alison Moyet, Ian McCulloch, Ingrid Helene Håvik and Anneli Drecker.

Order of St. Olav
The three members of A-ha, Morten Harket, Magne Furuholmen and Paul Waaktaar-Savoy, were appointed Knights of the First Class of the Royal Norwegian Order of St. Olav for their contribution to Norwegian music. The Royal Norwegian Order of St. Olav is granted as a reward for distinguished services to the country and humankind. The official ceremony took place on 6 November 2012.

Outside a-ha

Before Morten joined Pål and Magne, he was the lead singer of a soul band, Souldier Blue. In 1993, Harket performed a cover of "Can't Take My Eyes Off You" by Crewe/Gaudio on the Coneheads movie soundtrack in 1993.

After A-ha went on a hiatus in 1994, Harket pursued a solo career. He has released six studio albums. Harket released his solo album, Letter from Egypt, on 28 May 2008 via Universal Records Germany. In April 2012, Harket released his new solo album, Out of My Hands, in both Norway and Germany, and on 14 May in the UK. In April 2014, Harket released his sixth album, Brother. He also composed a song with his cousin's son, Blade Whitehead, for an annual music night.

Harket has collaborated in live performances and in studio recordings with several artists, among them Pakistani rock band Junoon, on the songs "Piya" and "Pyar Hai Zindagi"; and Hayley Westenra, on "Children First". He has also performed and worked with many other Scandinavian artists, such as Bjørn Eidsvåg, Silje Nergaard, Oslo Gospel Choir, Espen Lind, Elizabeth Norberg-Schulz and Carola Häggkvist.

In 2009, Harket created and performed the main theme of A Name is a Name, a film about Macedonia by Sigurjon Einarsson.

Other appearances
In addition to numerous A-ha and solo concerts, Harket has also performed on various other shows and concerts both as a solo artist and with a-ha. Some notable ones:
 Harket and Klaus Meine of the German band Scorpions performed a duet version of the Scorpions' hit song Wind of Change at a Scorpions concert in Athens, Greece, on 11 September 2013 for an MTV Unplugged album.
 Christina Aguilera and Pitbull performed the song "Feel This Moment", which contains sampling of a-ha's "Take On Me", live at the MGM Grand during the 2013 Billboard Music Awards with a surprise appearance from Morten Harket.
 UNICEF Benefit Concert (2005) – Sang the official UNICEF song "Children First" at the H.C. Andersen jubilee in Copenhagen, Denmark, 2005. The song is a duet and was sung with Hayley Westenra.
 He provided vocals to the Jan Bang single "Merciful Waters" which appears on the group's debut 1989 album Frozen Feelings.
 In January 2021, Harket appeared on the second series of the British version of The Masked Singer, masked as the Viking. He became the first contestant on the franchise to perform their own song, when he sang "Take on Me" in episode five. He finished in seventh place.

Vocal range and style
Morten Harket is known for his vocal range, which some sources have claimed spans five octaves, although Harket himself said in 2009, "I've never counted, quite honestly".

His voice is capable of "the greatest falsetto in the history of pop music EVER...", according to [[New Musical Express|NME'''s]] Sylvia Patterson, and of an "unyielding groan" as described in Entertainment Weekly. Sound engineer Gerry Kitchingham, who worked with a-ha on "Take On Me", described Harket as "an excellent singer" with "this incredibly strong falsetto and almost choir-boyish clarity".

Personal life

Harket has three children with his ex-wife Camilla Malmquist Harket, to whom he was married between 11 February 1989 and 1998. He has a daughter with a former girlfriend Anne Mette Undlien and another daughter with Inez Andersson.

One of his daughters, Tomine, sings in Alan Walker's song "Darkside".

Discography

Albums

Singles

Filmography
 1988 Kamilla og tyven (en. Kamilla and the Thief) as Christoffer
 1989 Kamilla og tyven II as Christoffer
 1996 Eurovision Song Contest as Co-Host
 2009 Yohan: The Child Wanderer as Yussuf
 2010 The Armstrong & Miller Show as himself (cameo appearance)
 2021 The Masked Singer'' – as Viking

Awards

See also
 List of Eurovision Song Contest presenters

References

External links

 Fan site
 Morten's official Myspace
 Site from Universal Germany
 A-ha's official site
 English/French site dedicated to Morten Harket

Living people
A-ha members
Norwegian expatriates in the United Kingdom
Norwegian male singers
Singers with a five-octave vocal range
Norwegian pop singers
Musicians from Kongsberg
Musicians from Asker
Norwegian multi-instrumentalists
English-language singers from Norway
Spellemannprisen winners
Norwegian new wave musicians
Synth-pop new wave musicians
Male new wave singers
1959 births